The Agalassoi [Hindi/Sanskrit - अग्राश्व; ] were a tribe that lived in modern Pakistan in the lower Indus Valley at the time of Alexander the Great. During Alexander's invasion of India, the Agalassoi fought against the Macedonian army. The citizen infantry, numbering about 40,000 and 2,000 cavalry failed to stop the advance of Alexander's army, they then cast themselves with their wives and children into flames, the first known Jauhar and Sākā in Indian history. They have been identified as Agarwals of today.

References

Battacharya, Sachchidananda. A Dictionary of Indian History (Westport: Greenwood Press, 1977) p. 10

Wars of Alexander the Great
Ancient peoples of India
Ancient peoples of Pakistan